Michael Monaghan (born 13 May 1980) is the current pathways and specialist coach for the Manly Warringah Sea Eagles in the National Rugby League and an Australian former professional rugby league footballer who played for the Canberra Raiders and Manly-Warringah Sea Eagles in the National Rugby League, and for the Warrington Wolves in the Super League.

Background
He is the brother of former Australia international Joel Monaghan.

Playing career

Canberra Raiders
He played with the Canberra Raiders from 2001 to 2003.

Manly-Warringah Sea Eagles

He played in the 2007 NRL grand final defeat against the Melbourne Storm.

Warrington Wolves

The 27-year-old joined Manly teammate Chris Hicks in moving to Warrington Wolves for 2008's Super League XIII.

In March 2009 rumours emerged linking him with his former club Canberra and playing alongside brother Joel Monaghan again.

Monaghan played for Warrington in the 2009 and 2010 Challenge Cup Final victories over Huddersfield Giants and Leeds respectively, winning the Lance Todd Trophy for his Man-of-Match performance in 2009.

He played in the 2010 Challenge Cup Final victory over the Leeds Rhinos at Wembley Stadium.

He played in the 2012 Challenge Cup Final victory over the Leeds Rhinos at Wembley Stadium.

He played in the 2012 Super League Grand Final defeat by the Leeds Rhinos at Old Trafford.

He played in the 2013 Super League Grand Final defeat by the Wigan Warriors at Old Trafford.

In May 2014, Monaghan announced he would be retiring at the end of the season.

Coaching career

Catalans Dragons
He then joined the Catalans Dragons as assistant coach for the 2015 season and took temporary charge in 2017 with fellow assistant Jerome Guisset following the French club's decision to part company with head coach Laurent Frayssinous.

Manly-Warringah Sea Eagles
In 2018 Monaghan re-joined former club Manly as Pathways / Specialist coach.

Honours

Warrington Wolves
Challenge Cup(3): 2009, 2010, 2012

Individual Awards
 2006 Ken Stephen award.
 2009 Lance Todd Trophy

References

External links
Manly give Monaghan a chance to find new club for 2008
Wolves sign Australian Monaghan

1980 births
Living people
Australian people of Irish descent
Australian expatriate sportspeople in England
Australian rugby league players
Canberra Raiders players
Catalans Dragons coaches
Lance Todd Trophy winners
Manly Warringah Sea Eagles captains
Manly Warringah Sea Eagles players
Rugby league halfbacks
Rugby league hookers
Rugby league players from Canberra
Warrington Wolves players